Grand Rapids Provincial Park is a provincial park in the Canadian province of Manitoba, designated in 1974. It is located south of the settlement of Grand Rapids, adjacent to the former riverbed of the Saskatchewan River.

See also
List of protected areas of Manitoba
List of provincial parks in Manitoba

Notes

References

External links

Provincial parks of Manitoba
Protected areas of Manitoba